Dobrzyca  is a village in the administrative district of Gmina Wałcz, within Wałcz County, West Pomeranian Voivodeship, in north-western Poland.

The village has a population of 130.

History
The territory became a part of the emerging Polish state under its first historic ruler Mieszko I in the 10th century. Dobrzyca was a private village of Polish nobility, administratively located in the Wałcz County in the Poznań Voivodeship in the Greater Poland Province.

During World War II, on February 5–8, 1945, it was the site of a battle, in which Polish troops defeated the Germans.

References

Villages in Wałcz County